Tachytes distinctus is a species of square-headed wasp in the family Crabronidae. It is found in the Caribbean Sea and North America.

Subspecies
These two subspecies belong to the species Tachytes distinctus:
 Tachytes distinctus bimini Krombein, 1953
 Tachytes distinctus distinctus F. Smith, 1856

References

External links

 

Crabronidae
Articles created by Qbugbot
Insects described in 1856